Kalis is a village and a former municipality in Kukës County, Albania. At the 2015 local government reform it became a subdivision of the municipality Kukës. The population at the 2011 census was 827. The municipal unit consists of the following villages:

Kalis
Gështenjë
Kodër-Gështenjë
Gurr
Pralish

References

Former municipalities in Kukës County
Administrative units of Kukës
Villages in Kukës County